Arkaitz Durán Aroca (born 19 May 1986) is a Spanish former professional road bicycle racer. Durán never had any victories as a professional.

Major results

2002
 3rd National Junior Cyclo-Cross Championships
2009
 9th Subida a Urkiola
2011
 2nd Trofeo Inca
2012
 1st Overall Vuelta a Cantabria
 1st Stages 4 & 5 Vuelta a Navarra
 1st Stage 3 Tour of Galicia
 1st Subida a Urraki
 8th Overall Vuelta Ciclista a León
2013
 6th Overall Vuelta a Asturias
2014
 2nd Overall Grande Prémio Abimota
1st Prologue

Grand Tour general classification results timeline

References

External links 

1986 births
Living people
Cyclists from the Basque Country (autonomous community)
Sportspeople from Vitoria-Gasteiz
Spanish male cyclists